The Price of Heaven is a TV movie directed by Peter Bogdanovich. It was an adaptation of Allan Gurganus's novella Blessed Assurance: A Moral Tale from the book White People.

Plot
Vesta Lotte Battle is a spinster who fixes broken china. She befriends Jerry Hill (Grant Show), a young white man who has returned from the Korean War. He works for a ruthless businessman (George Wendt) who persuades him to exploit poor blacks by selling them funeral insurance.

Cast
Cicely Tyson as Vesta Battle
Grant Show
Lori Loughlin
George Wendt

Reception
The New York Times said the film was "marred by a screenplay that makes its upper-class white characters... simply stupid rather than complicatedly so. But the back-and-forth between Ms. Tyson and Mr. Show is quick and sure, and they are very good at illustrating how imperfect redemption is better than no redemption at all."

The Los Angeles Times said "Bogdanovich is frightfully ham-fisted at times, but for the most part, he gently underscores what's going on here. Though it's never directly addressed, a civil rights awareness is blossoming in certain of these characters. Yet despite its good intentions, "The Price of Heaven" fizzles into just another tale of a handsome, promising young man who's trying to choose between his sweet longtime girlfriend (Lori Loughlin) and a rich, obnoxious bombshell (Cari Shayne)--as though, in the middle of production, everyone began acting from a discarded "Melrose Place" script."

References

External links
The Price of Heaven at TCMDB
The Price of Heaven at IMDb
Review at Variety

Films directed by Peter Bogdanovich
Films scored by Mark Snow